Ženski nogometni klub Slovenj Gradec, commonly referred to as ŽNK Slovenj Gradec or simply Slovenj Gradec, was a Slovenian women's football club from the town of Slovenj Gradec.

Honours
Slovenian League
 Runners-up (3): 2008–09, 2009–10, 2011–12

Slovenian Cup
 Runners-up (1): 2009–10

References

External links
Soccerway profile

Association football clubs established in 2004
Women's football clubs in Slovenia
2004 establishments in Slovenia